Wherever You Are is the eighth studio album by Third Day, and the band's ninth album overall.

The album debuted on the Billboard 200 at No. 8, performing comparably to major chart debuts such as Santana's All that I Am and Blink-182's Greatest Hits.

It was nominated for a Grammy Award for Best Pop/Contemporary Gospel album in 2006.

Track listing

LifeWay-exclusive bonus disc
 "Falling to Pieces" – 3:36
 "That's How the Story Goes" – 3:45
 "Cry Out to Jesus (Remix)" – 5:07

Singles 
"Cry Out to Jesus" (No. 1 Billboard Hot Christian Songs)
"Mountain of God" (No. 1 Billboard Hot Christian Songs)
"Tunnel" (No. 7 Billboard Hot Christian Songs)

Personnel 

Third Day
 Mac Powell – lead and backing vocals
 Brad Avery – guitars
 Mark Lee – guitars
 Tai Anderson – bass
 David Carr – drums

Additional musicians

 Geof Barkley – keyboards, backing vocals
 Blair Masters – keyboards
 Scotty Wilbanks – acoustic piano, Hammond organ, Wurlitzer electric piano
 Don McCollister – keyboards, percussion, string arrangements
 Eric Darken – percussion
 Conni Ellisor – string arrangements
 Carl Marsh – string arrangements, conductor
 Gavyn Wright – concertmaster
 London Session Orchestra – strings
 Ellie Bannister – backing vocals
 Drew Cline – backing vocals
 Travis Cottrell – backing vocals
 Michael Mellett – backing vocals
 Ashley Cleveland – backing vocals (9) 

Production

 Third Day – producers (1, 4, 5, 10, 11, 12)
 Brown Bannister – producer (2, 3, 6–9)
 Terry Hemmings – executive producer
 Traci Sterling Bishir – production coordination (2, 3, 6–9)
 Blaine Barcus – A&R
 Michelle Pearson – A&R production
 Steve Bishir – engineer
 Karl Egsieker – engineer
 Matt Goldman – engineer
 Don McCollister – engineer, digital editing
 Aaron Sternke – engineer, digital editing
 Tom Tapley – engineer
 F. Reid Shippen – mixing (1, 2, 3, 5, 6, 7, 9-12)
 Joe Baldridge – mixing (4, 8)
 Lee Bridges – mix assistant, digital editing
 Nathan Watkins – mix assistant
 Leon Zervos – mastering
 Tim Parker – art direction, design
 David Dobson – photography
 Traci Sgrignoli – stylist

Awards

In 2006, the album was nominated for a Dove Award for Rock/Contemporary Album of the Year at the 37th GMA Dove Awards.

References

Third Day albums
2005 albums
Essential Records (Christian) albums
Albums produced by Brown Bannister
Grammy Award for Best Pop/Contemporary Gospel Album